Lausanne-Sports Aviron is a Swiss rowing club.

The club was founded on 21 June 1916, located at Vidy-Lausanne.

The club has a number of national champions, and members of the club have rowed internationally, including at the Olympic Games.  The club colours are blue and white.

External links 
Club profile (Web Archive)*Club webpage (in French)

FC Lausanne-Sport
Sports clubs established in 1916
Rowing clubs in Switzerland
1916 establishments in Switzerland